Abingdon Boys School (stylized as abingdon boys school) is a Japanese rock band formed in 2005 and fronted by Japanese singer Takanori Nishikawa.

Formed in 2005, the band shares a name with the British independent school Abingdon School, in Abingdon, Oxfordshire, the all-male school where the rock band Radiohead was established.

Biography

Formation and influences
Abingdon Boys School began in 2005 when Takanori Nishikawa, known for his pop music as TM Revolution, decided to return to his rock roots in Luis-Mary with guitarist Sunao. They were introduced to guitarist Hiroshi Shibasaki (ex-Wands) and continued to discuss forming a band until an offer came to record a song for manga series Nana. The three presented a demo to producer Toshiyuki Kishi who became the fourth member of the band.

The origin of the name comes from a combination of Nishikawa's love of cars' anti-lock braking system and the resemblance of the initials to the pronunciation of the Tokyo district Ebisu where the band practiced. When searching on the internet for a backronym Nishikawa discovered Abingdon School and the connection to Radiohead, whose members are of the same generation. A.B.S are also all from the same generation and each fell in love with music when they were in school, so they thought "it would be cool if we could go back to that feeling again."

Abingdon Boys School intended to bring song structure back to pop and rock music, with elements such as "intros, vocal lines, guitar solos and instrumental sections". The band's style recalls 1980s hair-band era Van Halen and edgier '90s rock outfits such as Jane's Addiction.

History
In 2005, Abingdon Boys School released its first song, "Stay Away", an English-language song written by Nishikawa and composed by Shibasaki for the shōjo manga and anime series Nana tribute album Love for Nana ~Only 1 Tribute~. The band also recorded a cover of the Buck-Tick song  that was featured on the tribute album Parade -Respective Tracks of Buck-Tick-. The band's first live concert was performed on November 24, 2005, alongside Uverworld and Tsubakiya Quartet, a show presented by music magazine CD Data.

On September 3, 2006, the band announced that they would make their official debut through Sony Music Japan's Epic Records, which was also the label of Nishikawa's solo project T.M. Revolution. The band performed at the Japanese leg of Live Earth in Tokyo on July 7, 2007, and their first self titled album was released on October 17, 2007. Their debut peaked at no.2 on the Oricon charts. On July 16, 2008, Abingdon Boys School released a live DVD from the concert they held in February 2008.

In November 2009, Abingdon Boys School went on a tour through Europe, securing a record deal with Germany label Gan-Shin that saw their debut available in Europe. The band played shows in Helsinki, Stockholm, Hamburg, Berlin, Munich, Paris, London and Moscow. In London, the band played in Camden Underworld venue, famous in Japan as it was the place where Sadistic Mika Band had played in 1975, the first Japanese rock band to ever tour in Europe.

In Helsinki, Andy McCoy of 1980s hair-metal band Hanoi Rocks showed up unannounced, one of the groups idols.

A B-sides compilation album was then released in Japan titled Teaching Materials. Shortly after, a second studio album was announced for January 27, 2010, titled Abingdon Road. In addition to 6 new tracks, the album contained singles released since the band's first full album and a cover of "Sweetest Coma Again", originally found on Luna Sea Memorial Cover Album -Re:birth-. They released a book containing scores of their singles on November 12, 2010.

On August 7, 2012, Abingdon Boys School released "We Are" internationally, their first single in two and a half years. The title track was featured as the theme song for the PlayStation 3 video game Sengoku Basara HD Collection, which was released on September 5, 2012.

Abingdon Boys School performed at Inazuma Rock Festival 2018, marking their first live in six years. They performed at the festival again the following year and announced their first tour in 10 years for March 2020. However, the tour has been postponed due to the COVID-19 pandemic in Japan.

Work used in media
All of the band's singles are songs that have been used in anime and video games; perhaps owing to Nishikawa's personal interests, having gone so far as to voice a few anime roles himself. "Innocent Sorrow" was used as the opening for the D.Gray-Man anime; "Howling" and "From Dusk Till Dawn" for Darker Than Black and its sequel Ryūsei no Gemini; "Nephilim" for the PlayStation 3 game Folklore; "Blade Chord" and "Jap" for the Sengoku Basara series; "Strength" for the Soul Eater anime, and "Kimi no Uta" for Tokyo Magnitude 8.0. "Fre@k $HoW", the b-side off their "Innocent Sorrow" single, was also used in a tribute compilation CD for the movie Death Note 2: The Last Name. A slightly modified version of the b-side off their "Jap" single, dubbed "Valkyrie -Lioleia Mix-", was also featured in the Monster Hunter tribute album Monster Hunter 5th Anniversary.

Members
  – vocals
  – guitar
 Sunao – guitar
  – keyboards, turntables, programming

Support members
 Ikuo – bass guitar
  – drums

Discography

Studio albums
 Abingdon Boys School (2007)
 Abingdon Road (2010)

References

External links
  
 Sony Music Japan page 
 Nippon Project interview

Gan-Shin artists
Sony Music Entertainment Japan artists
Japanese alternative rock groups
Musical groups established in 2005
Musical quartets
Musical groups from Tokyo